Adirondack Lake is a lake located north of Indian Lake, New York. The outlet flows through a creek into Lake Abanakee. Fish species present in the lake are northern pike, white sucker, largemouth bass, black bullhead, yellow perch, rock bass, and pumpkinseed sunfish. There is a carry down on the southeast shore off NY-28 near the dam.

References

Lakes of New York (state)
Lakes of Hamilton County, New York